Born in Birmingham, Nerm is a DJ, music broadcaster and film fixer, a term given to someone who helps arrange everything involved in film production, from pre-production and scheduling through to editing and marketing.

Nerm made first "mixes" at a very young age using cut up cassette tapes edited together. At the age of 16, he transitioned from cassette to vinyl and started DJing. His first residency as a DJ was at the Ministry of Sound in Birmingham.

Initially associated with the Asian Underground movement, then drum & bass, he is now a proponent of alternative and electronic music and curates festivals, radio shows, club nights and soundtracks.

Early life
Nerm's passion for music and mixing started at the age of 10 whilst playing around with some D90 cassette tapes.

Early career
Nerm gained press and TV attention in 2000 as the dancer in the electro-punk band Charged, signed to Nation Records. Around the same time he became the headline DJ at London's underground clubnight, Swaraj.

Swaraj was the platform on which Nerm pioneered Shiva Soundsystem, by amalgamating the live energy of a band with the dance floor by integrating musicians in his sets. Shiva Soundsystem began as a group, which then progressed into an extensive association of musicians, producers and DJs whose headquarters was a large warehouse space in Hackney, East London. Shiva Soundsystem helped introduce new, acts from across the world to clubbing audiences in London.

Breakthrough
Nerm, alongside Shiva Soundsystem, curated events, first running parties at their warehouse HQ with international guest performers, then, more legitimately, playing weekend residencies in East London's underground night clubs. Herbal in Shoreditch and Vibe Bar in Brick Lane were two such residencies which featured guests such as Aphex Twin, Commix, Andrew Weatherall, Logistics, Colin Dale, Moving Fusion and Sub Swara. New live bands and offshoot live projects of other acts also featured including Aziz, Ian Brown's guitarist and co-writer of his debut solo album.

Shiva Soundsystem toured India and played Glastonbury every year from 2002.

In 2005 Shiva Soundsystem became a record label to release production from the collective and other associated artists. The first drum & bass/bass mix album fashioned for India, titled India:One  was mixed and released by Nerm. Shiva Soundsystem's releases obtained support from Pete Tong, Pendulum and Laurent Garnier.

Media
In tandem with Shiva Soundsystem came invitations for Nerm to host and share his passion for underground music with interest from TV and radio channels including E! Channel (Venezuela), Radio 1 MTV India and BBC 2 which led to Nerm's progression as a broadcaster, at first on the BBC Asian Network radio station with his weekly show Electro East.

Electro East represented a wide spectrum of underground music from across the world with artists at the beginning of their ascents to stars as guests including Chase and Status, Noisia, Benga and Brookes Brothers and more specialist artists enduser, V.I.V.E.K (Deep Medi) and Amit (Commercial Suicide)

In 2008, with label-mate D-Code, Nerm embarked on a two-year run on BBC Radio 1 featuring a range of underground music. Guests included a series of "vs" DJ battles:

Foreign Beggars vs Drum & Bass (production from Noisia and Alix Perez)
DJ Marky vs Norman Jay
Rusko vs John B
Appleblim vs Filthy Dukes
Matt Helders (Arctic Monkeys) vs London Elektricity
Sub Focus vs The Count & Sinden

Nerm & D-Code also stood in for Mary Anne Hobbs, Ras Kwame and for 1Xtra's Drum & Bass Mix Show and presented alongside Annie Mac and Zane Lowe.

In 2010, Nerm presented his final shows on BBC Radio 1 and BBC Asian Network.

In 2011, Nerm began to host on BBC 6Music primarily presenting the 6Mix alongside fellow residents Groove Armada, Erol Alkan, Andrew Weatherall, Tiga & Ben Watt and guests DJ Shadow and Thom Yorke.

He has also stood in for Gilles Peterson.

Nerm continues to DJ with appearances at major festivals including Bestival, with Riz Ahmed aka Riz MC, Foreign Beggars and with Shiva Soundsystem.

Film
In 2010, Nerm acted as consultant, remixer and supervisor on the music for Everywhere and Nowhere from Kidulthood director Menhaj Huda. He has since become more involved in film with work on soundtracks, marketing and a few cameo appearances.

Discography

Singles and EPs
 Shiva Soundsystem - Mumbai Cells SSR001 (2005)
 D-Code feat Nerm - Outlaw SSR006 (2009)

Albums
 India:One (2008)
 Phasmatis In Machina (2009)
 India:Two (2009 - India Only)

References

External links
 
 

Living people
English DJs
Year of birth missing (living people)